BMNH may refer to:

BMNH, the museum code of the British Museum of Natural History, London
Beijing Museum of Natural History, in Beijing, China
Biblical Museum of Natural History, in Beit Shemesh, Israel